Ludovico Di Santo (born November 21, 1977 in  Lincoln, Buenos Aires, Argentina) is an Argentine actor and model.

Biography 
Ludovico Di Santo was born on November 21, 1977 at the Sanatorio Anchorena from the City of Buenos Aires, Argentina. At age 6 he went to live with his family to Lincoln, Buenos Aires, Argentina until the age of 18 he returned to live in the Capital.

Filmography

Television

Theater

Movies

Videoclips

Awards and nominations

References

21st-century Argentine male actors
Male actors from Buenos Aires
1977 births
Living people
Argentine male telenovela actors
People from Lincoln Partido